Acinetobacter haemolyticus is a species of bacterium. Its type strain is ATCC 17906. It is potentially pathogenic.

Acinetobacter Haemolyticus can be used as a promising microorganism for Cr(VI) reduction from industrial waste waters.

Acinetobacter Haemolyticus or ZYL is a new aerobic denitrifying bacterium. The strain could use nitrate, nitrite and ammonium as the sole N-source for growth with a final product of N2, demonstrating its good abilities for aerobic denitrification and heterotrophic nitrification.

References

Pei, Shahir, S., Santhana Raj, A. S., Zakaria, Z. A., & Ahmad, W. A. (2009). Chromium(VI)		 resistance and removal by Acinetobacter haemolyticus. World Journal of Microbiology		 & Biotechnology, 25(6), 1085–1093. https://doi.org/10.1007/s11274-009-9989-2

Wang, Zou, Y.-L., Chen, H., & Lv, Y.-K. (2021). Nitrate removal performances of a new 	aerobic denitrifier, Acinetobacter haemolyticus ZYL, isolated from domestic wastewater.		 Bioprocess and Biosystems Engineering, 44(2), 391–401.						 https://doi.org/10.1007/s00449-020-02451-0

Further reading

External links
Type strain of Acinetobacter haemolyticus at BacDive -  the Bacterial Diversity Metadatabase

Moraxellaceae
Bacteria described in 1986